The Accusing Song is a 1936 German musical drama film directed by Georg Zoch and starring Louis Graveure, Gina Falckenberg and Walter Rilla. It was shot at the Tempelhof Studios in Berlin.

Cast
 Louis Graveure as Kammersänger Harden
 Gina Falckenberg as Vera, seine Frau
 Walter Rilla as Detlef Ollmer - Bildhauer
 Walter Janssen as Justus Kramer
 Hanna Waag as Maria, seine Tochter
 Fritz Odemar as Baron Brix
 Margarete Lanner as Baronin Brix
 Erwin Biegel as Josef - Hardens Diener
 Johanna Blum as Anni - Frau Hardens Zofe
 Carla Rust as Emma - Dienstmädchen bei Ollmer
 Herbert Hübner as Kriminalkommissar Collander
 Albert Probeck as Kriminalassistent Breuer
 Georg A. Profé as Kriminalassistent Rothaus
 Gerhard Dammann as Portier Krüger
 Eva Tinschmann as Olga, seine Frau
 Bruno Tillessen as Danneberg

References

Bibliography 
 
 Klaus, Ulrich J. Deutsche Tonfilme: Jahrgang 1936. Klaus-Archiv, 1988.

External links 
 

1936 films
1930s musical drama films
German musical drama films
Films of Nazi Germany
1930s German-language films
Films directed by Georg Zoch
German black-and-white films
1936 drama films
Films scored by Eduard Künneke
1930s German films
Films shot at Tempelhof Studios